Bengoro located at  31°02′54″S 142°08′20″ is a remote civil parish of Mootwingee County in far North West New South Wales.

The parish is equidistant from Packsaddle, Fowlers Gap and White Cliffs, New South Wales.
The parish has a Köppen climate classification of BWh (Hot desert).

References

Parishes of Mootwingee County
Far West (New South Wales)